Goran Marić (born 2 November 1981 in Novi Sad, SR Serbia, Yugoslavia) is a Serbian volleyball player. As a member of national team, he became European Champion in 2001. He plays for Paris Volley.

External links
Profile at Umbria Volley website

Living people
1981 births
Sportspeople from Novi Sad
Serbian men's volleyball players
Serbian expatriate sportspeople in Italy
Serbian expatriate sportspeople in France